Podium Sans is the typeface used on all models of iPod with color displays previous to the iPod lineup refresh on September 5, 2007.

When the iPod photo was first announced Apple claimed that the device featured a "new Myriad typeface," stating...
Now in living color, it's easier to read than ever. That’s thanks in part to the clarity of the display – it offers 220x176-pixel resolution – and in part to the new Myriad typeface.

The use of Adobe Myriad would have been the first example of Apple using the same font in branding and user interface and indeed the high-res advertising mock-ups clearly used the font. However, at the time few noticed that the font on the devices was missing Myriad's trademark features, such as its 'k' and 'K', its splayed 'M' and distinctive 'y'. Some of these changes, such as the straightening of the 'M', could be explained by Apple's designers simplifying the design to accommodate the small size and low resolution of the device compared to print, however other changes are harder to explain.

Whether Podium Sans started life as Myriad or another humanist sans-serif font is up for debate, but Apple no longer mentions the Myriad typeface in connection with the iPod user interface.

On newer models, such as the 3G iPod nano, iPod classic and iPod Touch Podium Sans has been replaced with Helvetica Neue Bold, the same typeface used throughout the iPhone user interface.

See also
 Apple typography
 List of Apple typefaces

References

Apple Inc. typefaces
Humanist sans-serif typefaces